Hello, It's Me! (translit. Barev, yes em) is a 1966 Soviet Armenian drama film directed by Frunze Dovlatyan. It was entered into the 1966 Cannes Film Festival, nominated to Palme d'Or and awarded by the State Prize of Armenia in 1967. The film is based on Artem Alikhanian's biography.

Plot
Artyom Manvelyan is a famous physicist and founder of a cosmology laboratory in Aragats. With loyalty and gentleness, he keeps the memories of the World War period, lost love and his friends.

Cast
 Armen Dzhigarkhanyan as Artyom Manvelyan
 Rolan Bykov as Oleg Ponomaryov
 Natalya Fateyeva as Lyusya
 Margarita Terekhova as Tanya
 Luchana Babichkova as Irina Pavlovna
 Frunze Dovlatyan as Zaryan
 Galya Novents as Nazi
 Georgi Tusuzov as Aharon Izrailevich
 Aleksei Bakhar as Stepfather
 Natalya Vorobyova as Tanya in childhood (as Natasha Vorobyova)
 Martyn Vartazaryan (as Martin Vardazaryan)

See also
 List of Armenian films

References

External links

1966 drama films
1966 films
Soviet black-and-white films
Films directed by Frunze Dovlatyan
Films set in Armenia
Soviet drama films
Soviet-era Armenian films
Armenfilm films
Armenian drama films
Armenian black-and-white films
Armenian-language films